Manihari Assembly constituency is an assembly constituency in Katihar district in the Indian state of Bihar. It is reserved for scheduled tribes now, but earlier was an open seat.

Overview
As per Delimitation of Parliamentary and Assembly constituencies Order, 2008, No 67. Manihari Assembly constituency (ST) is composed of the following: Manihari, Mansahi and Amdabad community development blocks.

Manihari Assembly constituency is part of No 11 Katihar (Lok Sabha constituency).

Members of Legislative Assembly

^ denotes By-elections

Election results

2020

1977-2010

In the 2010 state assembly elections, Manohar Prasad Singh of JD(U) won the Minihari (ST) assembly seat defeating his nearest rival Gita Kisku of NCP. Contests in most years were multi cornered but only winners and runners up are being mentioned. In the Manihari open constituency Mubarak Hussain of Congress defeated Vishwanath Singh of JD(U) in October 2005 and Sagir Ahmad of NCP in February 2005. Vishwanath Singh of JD(U) defeated Sagir Ahmad of NCP in 2000. Mubarak Hussain of Congress defeated Viswanath Singh of JD in 1995. Viswanath Singh of JD defeated Mubarak Hussain of Congress in 1990. Mubarak Hussain of Congress defeated Ram Sipahi Yadav of JP in 1985. Ram Sipahi Yadav of Janata Party (JP) defeated Mubarak Hussain of Congress in 1980. Ram Sipahi Yadav of JP defeated Amarnath Singh Yadav of Congress in 1977.

References

External links
 

Assembly constituencies of Bihar
Politics of Katihar district